West Vancouver Blue Bus, formally West Vancouver Municipal Transit, was founded in 1912 and is one of the oldest continuously operated municipal systems in North America. The company operates as a sub-contractor to TransLink, Metro Vancouver's regional transportation authority.

Routes

As of April 2020, Blue Bus operates the following 12 routes, serving the cities of West Vancouver, North Vancouver, Vancouver and the Village of Lions Bay:  

 214 Phibbs Exchange / Blueridge (Operates Community Shuttle service during off-peak times)
 215 Phibbs Exchange / Indian River
 227 Phibbs Exchange / Lynn Valley Centre
 250 Vancouver / Horseshoe Bay / Dundarave (250A)
 251 Park Royal / Queens
 252 Park Royal / Inglewood
 253 Vancouver / Park Royal / Caulfeild
 254 Vancouver / Park Royal / British Properties
 255 Capilano University / Dundarave
 256 Park Royal / Whitby Estates / Spuraway
 258 West Vancouver / UBC (Operates during peak hours only when the University of British Columbia is in regular academic session from September to April)
 262 Lions Bay / Caulfeild

All buses are designated "Fare Paid Zones", which means passengers are required by law to have a valid fare while on board the bus.  Failing to pay the fare or not having a valid fare while on board the bus could result in the passenger being fined $173 and/or removed from the bus.  Fare inspections are conducted by Transit Security Officers and members from the South Coast British Columbia Transportation Authority Police Service.

Active fleet
All active West Vancouver Blue Bus vehicles are owned by TransLink. West Vancouver Blue Bus owned their own buses until August 2019.

Numbering
West Vancouver buses are numbered by production year and unit number. For example, bus number 1201 would be produced in 2012, and the first unit received from that order. Exceptions to this are buses built before 1991 and Community Shuttles built before 2013. Since 2017, Community Shuttles follow the standard TransLink numbering system, adding a "5" in between the year and unit number to denote its place in TransLink's Community Shuttle "500" series.

Retired/Transferred fleet

References

External links
 Blue Bus website
 TransLink website

Transit agencies in British Columbia
TransLink (British Columbia)
Transport in West Vancouver